Jaar may refer to:

Jaʿār, a town in the Abyan Governorate of southwestern Yemen
Kiriath-Jearim, a biblical city in the Land of Israel 
Journal of the American Academy of Religion, an American Journal on Religion
Chhaang, a Nepalese alcoholic beverage

Persons with the surname
Abubakar Jaar (fl. 1945–1946), guardian and mayor of Padang
Alfredo Jaar (born 1956), Chilean-born artist, architect, and filmmaker
Alfredo Jaar (born 1993), Chilean photographer and audiovisual artist
Nicolas Jaar (born 1990), American-Chilean musician
Ricardo Jaar (born 1968), Honduran Academic and Businessman
Roger Jaar, Haitian businessman
Salomón Jaar (1962–2010), Honduran politician

See also
JAARS, a nonprofit organization that provides technical services assisting in Bible translation
Jar (disambiguation)